The Piazza Euclide railway station is a railway station in Rome (Italy), on the Rome–Civitacastellana–Viterbo railway, managed by ATAC.
It is the only underground stop of the line, excluding the Flaminio terminus.

The official name of the facility is Stazione Euclide, as shown on the signs visible from the square; in the past, however, it was indicated on the railway timetables as Roma P. Euclide or, in another source, as p.za Euclide.

Location 
The stop is located in the urban track of Rome, in Piazza Euclide, in the quarter Pinciano on the border with the quarter Parioli; it is accessed from one of the buildings located on the square, on the corner with Via Civinini, in front of the Basilica of the Immaculate Heart of Mary. 
The platforms are accessed via a first flight of stairs leading to the mezzanine, followed by two further flights leading to the two side platforms.

It is one of the stops of the line that record the most traffic, since it is located in a densely inhabited area with a high number of offices. The facility serves the residential quarters Parioli and Pinciano.

History 
In 1947 the city administration of Rome requested the construction of a stop on the underground section of the Rome–Civitacastellana–Viterbo railway, then under renovation to double it.
The location of Piazza Euclide was chosen, since it represented an important traffic junction for the quarters Flaminio and Parioli.

The project was approved by the Higher Council for Public Works in 1948, but it took until March 1952 to obtain the ministerial decree authorizing the work. The construction therefore began in 1953 and the stop was inaugurated on 15 January 1958.

The total cost was around 500 million lire.

In the summer of 2009 the station was closed due to renovation and upgrading works that affected the whole urban section of the line; during the approximately 70 days of interruption, the platforms were raised to achieve the ground-level boarding; furthermore, the architectural barriers were eliminated thanks to the installation of stairlifts and the creation of guided paths for partially sighted people. The fire-fighting system was also renewed and a new lighting system was installed as well.

Surroundings 
Teatro Euclide
Piazza Euclide
Villa Glori
Auditorium Parco della Musica
Villaggio Olimpico
Stadio Flaminio
Palazzetto dello Sport
Basilica Minore del Sacro Cuore di Maria
Fountain of Anna Perenna

Services 
The station has:
  Ticket office
  Ticket machine

Interchanges 
  ATAC bus stop

Notes

Bibliography 
 M. Canevelli, La fermata sotterranea di Piazza Euclide della ferrovia Roma-Civitacastellana-Viterbo, in "Trasporti Pubblici", Rome 1958.
 Vittorio Formigari, Piero Muscolino, La metropolitana a Roma, Calosci, Cortona, 1983, pp. 210–245.

External links 
 The station on ATAC website. 
 

Railway stations in Rome
Railway stations located underground in Italy